Oregon Trail Ruts State Historic Site is a preserved site of wagon ruts of the Oregon Trail on the North Platte River, about 0.5 miles south of Guernsey, Wyoming. The Oregon Trail here was winding up towards South Pass.  Here, wagon wheels, draft animals, and people wore down the trail into a sandstone ridge about two to six feet, during its heavy usage from 1841–1869. The half-mile stretch is "unsurpassed" and is the best-preserved set of Oregon Trail ruts anywhere along its former length.

The site is maintained as a state historic site, and was declared a National Historic Landmark and added to the National Register of Historic Places in 1966.

History
The trail was first recorded in 1812, when Robert Stuart and six others came through here heading east from Fort Astoria, Oregon. Traders, trappers, and missionaries used this route before 1841 when the Bartleson–Bidwell Party became the first wagon train across the trail. The number of emigrants grew from 100 plus in 1842 to over 900 in 1843. With the completion of the Union Pacific Railroad in 1869, use of the trail as an overland route to the Pacific rapidly declined, although sections of it continued to be used locally for many years.

Site
The route was chosen to avoid the marshy ground along the river.

References

External links

Oregon Trail Ruts State Historic Site Wyoming State Parks, Historic Sites & Trails
Oregon Trail Ruts National Historic Landmark at the Wyoming State Historic Preservation Office

National Historic Landmarks in Wyoming
Oregon Trail
California Trail
Protected areas of Platte County, Wyoming
Wyoming state historic sites
Roads on the National Register of Historic Places in Wyoming
National Register of Historic Places in Platte County, Wyoming